Little Falls is a city in Morrison County, Minnesota, United States, near the geographic center of the state. Established in 1848, Little Falls is one of the oldest European-American cities in Minnesota. It is the county seat of Morrison County. The population was 9,140 at the 2020 census. Little Falls was the boyhood home of noted aviator Charles Lindbergh. Just across from his former home is Charles A. Lindbergh State Park, named after Lindbergh's father, prominent Minnesota lawyer and U.S. Congressman Charles August Lindbergh.

The town developed at falls on the Mississippi River, and was named after them. Several different dams have been built over the falls during the town's history, some of which powered sawmills in the 19th century. Today, the Little Falls Dam is a hydroelectric station that generates power for the surrounding area.

Geography

U.S. Highway 10 and Minnesota State Highways 27 and 371 are three of the main routes in the city.

Little Falls is also the eastern terminus of Minnesota Highway 28, which heads to Browns Valley at its western terminus at the Minnesota–South Dakota border. Highway 28 is co-signed with Highway 27, 12 miles west of town, until it turns towards Swanville. Highway 28 is unsigned until outside the city limits.

Minnesota Highway 238 is also nearby, linking Minnesota Highway 27 at Little Falls to Interstate 94 (I-94) in Albany, 35 miles south of Little Falls.

A large ravine used to run through the east side business district, past the Morrison County Courthouse and the original Little Falls City Hall. The ravine served as an outflow for excess water from Fletcher Creek, which flows into the Mississippi River approximately six miles north of the city. Filling of the ravine began in the 1880s, to allow city development, and continued until the 1950s. It was directly filled with dirt in some locations, while in other places, buildings were built over the ravine.

Demographics

2020 census
As of the census of 2020, there were 9,140 people, 3,951 households. There were 4,243 housing units. The racial makeup of the city was 95.2% White, 0.2% African American, 0.1% Native American, 0.3% Asian, 0.0% from other races, and 2.9% from two or more races. Hispanic or Latino of any race were 2.6% of the population.

There were 3,951 households. The average household size was 2.20.

21.3% of residents were under the age of 18; and 24.5% were 65 years of age or older. The gender makeup of the city was 47.4% male and 52.6% female.

2010 census
As of the census of 2010, there were 8,343 people, 3,608 households, and 2,055 families residing in the city. The racial makeup of the city was 96.1% White, 0.8% African American, 0.4% Native American, 0.5% Asian, 0.2% from other races, and 1.9% from two or more races. Hispanic or Latino of any race were 1.4% of the population.

There were 3,608 households, of which 27.2% had children under the age of 18 living with them, 38.1% were married couples living together, 13.5% had a female householder with no husband present, 5.3% had a male householder with no wife present, and 43.0% were non-families. 36.5% of all households were made up of individuals, and 17.2% had someone living alone who was 65 years of age or older. The average household size was 2.21 and the average family size was 2.85.

The median age in the city was 40.9 years. 22.2% of residents were under the age of 18; 8.6% were between the ages of 18 and 24; 23.4% were from 25 to 44; 25.2% were from 45 to 64; and 20.6% were 65 years of age or older. The gender makeup of the city was 46.9% male and 53.1% female.

2000 census
As of the 2000 census, there were 7,719 people (2008: 8,121 population), 3,197 households, and 1,899 families residing in the city. The racial makeup of the city was 97.21% White, 0.49% African American, 0.52% Native American, 0.52% Asian, 0.06% Pacific Islander, 0.23% from other races, and 0.96% from two or more races. Hispanic or Latino of any race were 1.05% of the population. 38.2% were of German, 16.5% Polish, 8.4% Norwegian and 7.8% Swedish ancestry.

There were 3,197 households, out of which 29.2% had children under the age of 18 living with them, 42.8% were married couples living together, 13.0% had a female householder with no husband present, and 40.6% were non-families. 36.0% of all households were made up of individuals, and 17.8% had someone living alone who was 65 years of age or older. The average household size was 2.29 and the average family size was 2.95.

In the city, the population was spread out, with 24.9% under the age of 18, 8.2% from 18 to 24, 25.7% from 25 to 44, 18.7% from 45 to 64, and 22.5% who were 65 years of age or older. The median age was 39 years. For every 100 females, there were 85.5 males. For every 100 females age 18 and over, there were 80.5 males.

The median income for a household in the city was $30,547, and the median income for a family was $40,298. Males had a median income of $30,925 versus $22,922 for females. The per capita income for the city was $15,924. About 9.2% of families and 15.9% of the population were below the poverty line, including 15.8% of those under age 18 and 23.1% of those age 65 or over.

Education

Little Falls has several schools which include:
 Little Falls Community Schools (the public school system)
Lindbergh Elementary
Lincoln Elementary
Dr. S. G. Knight Elementary, a satellite school for the Little Falls district
Little Falls Community Middle School
Little Falls Community High School
Little Falls Continuing Education School
 Other
Mary of Lourdes School (pre-kindergarten through grade 8 but on two campuses) Catholic

Attractions
 Charles A. Lindbergh State Park and Historical Site is on the Mississippi River. This  park was established in 1931 in memory of United States Congressman and Minnesota lawyer Charles A. Lindbergh, Sr., also known as the father of aviator Charles Lindbergh. The historical site includes the home where the aviator spent summers next to the Mississippi River and a visitor's center that tells the Lindbergh family story and displays a full-size replica of The Spirit of St. Louis cockpit. The home, with its original family furnishings and possessions, is open for informational tours.

Two large colored murals by Frank Gosiak depicting the logging era and Main Street of Little Falls in the early 1900s were painted on the façade of the Hennepin Paper Co. warehouse on Broadway Avenue West, across from Cass Gilbert Depot. A third Gosiak mural, Door Into the Past, depicts historic Little Falls and its development to the present day. The mural is on a building at the intersection of Broadway Avenue East and Second Street.  

Two public frescoes were created at Lindbergh Elementary School by local artist Charles Kapsner. The first, The Stewardship, was completed in 1994 and portrays the values of Charles Lindbergh. It may be seen at all times of the day from 9th Street SE, as it is in a hall with glass to the exterior. The other fresco, Beginnings, is on an interior wall. It depicts the origins of Central Minnesota life and history.

The mansions of Charles A. Weyerhaeuser and Richard "Drew" Musser stand on 1st St SE alongside the Mississippi River and adjacent to Maple Island Park. They are furnished with antiques and original belongings of the entrepreneurial families who once occupied them. The estates are collectively known as the Linden Hill Historical Event Center. They are used for education, tours, overnight stays, conferences/retreats, weddings, family reunions and assorted special events.

Pine Grove Primeval Park and Zoo is on the west side of town, among pines in a  park. It features a zoo, walking trails, picnic and playground area, a granite "council circle", and a rustic log shelter. The zoo is home to a variety of exotic, native and domestic animals, including cougars, bobcats, tigers, timber wolves, bears, pronghorn, bison, elk, white tail deer, prairie dogs, yaks and a petting stable.

On the southeast side of town is St. Francis Convent and Campus. It was founded in 1891 by the Roman Catholic order of Franciscan Sisters of the Immaculate Conception of Little Falls.

 The Morrison County Historical Society owns and operates The Charles A. Weyerhaeuser Memorial Museum, on the west side of the Mississippi River above the confluence of Pike Creek. Weyerhaeuser was a lumberman who managed the Pine Tree Lumber Company. The Weyerhaeuser Museum property adjoins the Charles A. Lindbergh Historic Site and Lindbergh State Park. The museum was built as the new home of the Morrison County Historical Society between 1974 and 1975, with the official dedication on August 24, 1975. Before that, the Morrison County Historical Society, which was founded in 1936, made its home in the basement of the Historic Morrison County Courthouse. The Weyerhaeuser Museum contains exhibits of three-dimensional artifacts and a full archive of documents, newspapers and photos related to county history. Museum grounds are home to natural prairie gardens, a Victorian-style fountain, and a gazebo overlooking the river. The Weyerhaeuser Museum is open year-round to visitors and researchers.

The Minnesota Fishing Museum (MFM) is a nonprofit organization dedicated to preserving the heritage and history of freshwater fishing in Minnesota. It features over 8,000 artifacts in two large display rooms, the O'FISH-L Gift Shop, and tourism and DNR information. The MFM and the Minnesota Department of Natural Resources (DNR) partner in the MinnAqua education programs. The MFM is also host of the Let's Go Fishing Minnesota, Little Falls Chapter.

The Paul Larson Memorial Museum, owned by John Monahan, is a collection of boats, motors and trailers. Larson founded the Little Falls-based Larson Boats, as well as the Fred Larson Wildlife Animal Collection.

The Burton-Rosenmeier House was built in 1903 for Barney Burton. Burton, born to Isaac and Sarah Burton, was the seventh of eight children. At age 18, he moved from Wisconsin to St. Cloud, Minnesota, where he engaged in the clothing and men's furnishing business with his brother, Jacob, as a partner. In 1886, they moved their business to Little Falls, but in 1891 the brothers dissolved their partnership. Nevertheless, the business kept growing and the Barney Burton Clothing Store became the largest mercantile business in Morrison County. Burton married Sarah Deautsch, of Minneapolis, in 1894. She died after the birth of their daughter. In 1898, Barney married Josephine, a sister of Sarah, and had three children. At the turn of the century, they were becoming increasingly prosperous and began planning and building a home. In 1903, they started to build their house in the Classical Revival Style. Barney died of a heart attack in 1942 and Josephine died in 1953. 
Christian and Linda Rosenmeier moved to Little Falls in 1914 and resided in a flat over the Barney Burton Clothing Store. In 1921, they purchased the home with their three children, Gordon, Margaret and Donald, from the Burton family. Christian had a long career as an attorney, a president of the American National Bank and American Savings and Trust Company, and as a Minnesota state senator from 1922 to 1932. As a state senator, he was the author of the legislation, and helped in establishing Camp Ripley and Lindbergh State Park.
Gordon Rosenmeier, Christian's oldest son, followed in his father's footsteps. In 1940, he was elected to the unexpired term of the late senator Fred Miller of Little Falls, and he served in the Minnesota State Senate under eight successive governors. During his three decades of service, he authored series of major bills. Gordon was also a corporate attorney for the local lumber barons R.D. Musser and C.A. Weyerheauser, whose mansions are on the adjacent property to the Rosenmeier estate. His story would not be complete without mentioning his dearest friend and companion, Margaret Hastings. After her divorce, she resettled in Brainerd, where she had accepted a teaching position. Gordon provided advice and counsel in her relocation process. Margaret served as a sounding board for Gordon's pursuit of better government. She became an active participant in documenting his political life through a series of scrapbooks, which provided an orderly collection of media commentary. The Burton-Rosenmeier House serves as the Little Falls Convention and Visitors Bureau.

Events

Little Falls Dam Festival
Beginning in 2005, the Dam Festival is an annual event that takes place in Maple Island Park. The festival was founded by Richard John Lano of Crawfordsville, Indiana, who had relatives in Little Falls and Long Prairie, Minnesota. It is held at LeBourget Park and surrounding areas near the town's dam in late June. Activities include street dances, simple games, face painting, food, a petting zoo, pony rides, bingo, karaoke, a parade, and specialty shows. The event usually culminates with a fireworks show over the Mississippi River.

In June 2013, The Voice USA season 3 contestant Nicholas David performed a concert at the festival.

Little Falls Arts and Crafts Fair
The Arts and Craft Fair is an annual fair held the weekend after Labor Day. It is sponsored by the Little Falls Chamber of Commerce since 1972. This attracts numerous visitors and the town is bustling.

Rock the Park
Held every Summer during the month of June; typically towards the end of the month. Rock the Park is a unique concert experience because of its representation of local talent, most of the members in Brothers Tone and The Big Groove are from the Little Falls area.  This free outdoor concert on the banks of the Mississippi is a perfect way to kick off the summer & give back to the community! The event is completely funded by almost 30 local business sponsors, including our 2016 Primary Business Sponsor The Rustic Saloon. Executive Director Jill Moore comments, "it's an outdoor music event that is unparalleled in our region."

Little Falls Antiques and Collectibles Fair
This event held the weekend after Labor Day as well. It is held at Le Bourget Park on the West Side of town. Sponsored by the West Side Improvement Association.

Lone Eagle Auto Club Car Show
Held the Sunday after Labor Day at the Morrison County Fairgrounds. Antique Car Show and swap meet.

Morrison County Fair
An annual fair held at the Morrison County Fairgrounds northeast of town.

Greater Minnesota Two-Cylinder Club Annual Field Days
The club hosts this show the First Weekend in May Annually out at the Morrison County Fairgrounds. It features plowing, a swap meet, consignment auction, flea market, antique tractor pull, and more!

Media
The Morrison County Record is a weekly newspaper published in Little Falls.

Little Falls Radio Corporation has three stations:
 KLTF AM 960
 WYRQ FM 92.1
 KFML FM 94.1

Central Minnesota Access Television operates two Public-access television cable TV channels, (Channel 6 and Channel 12), that serve as a medium for community updates, as well as events like school sports, concerts, and fitness programs. The channels were originally broadcast out of Little Falls Community High School, but were moved to the Great River Arts Center in downtown Little Falls.

Notable people
 Frances Eliza Babbitt, 19th century teacher and archaeologist
 Greg Blaine, Minnesota state legislator, farmer, and businessman
 Duane Bobick, world champion amateur heavyweight boxer
 Joe Brinkman, American League baseball umpire
 Louise Erdrich, National Book Award novelist
 Gordon D. Gerling, Minnesota state legislator and businessman
 Gale Gillingham, five-time NFL All Pro Guard, two-time Super Bowl Champion, Green Bay Packers
 Ben Hanowski, member of the 2013 Calgary Flames
 Brian Kobilka, Nobel Prize-winning professor of chemistry
 Jim Langer, member of the Pro Football Hall of Fame
 Charles A. Lindbergh, First person to fly across the Atlantic Ocean in a solo, non-stop flight (1927)
 Christian Rosenmeier, lawyer and state senator
 Gordon Rosenmeier, lawyer and state senator; son of Christian
 John E. Simonett, lawyer & Minnesota Supreme Court Justice
 Byron David Smith, American veteran convicted of murdering burglars at his home
 William Stobb, poet
 George P. Wetzel, Sr., Minnesota State Representative and jurist
 Arthur DeLacy Wood, chairperson of the United States Parole Commission
 Fred Zollner, founder of Fort Wayne Pistons (now Detroit)

Sister cities
 Le Bourget, France (since 1987)

References

External links

 City Website
 
 Little Falls, Minnesota Police Department

Cities in Minnesota
Cities in Morrison County, Minnesota
Minnesota populated places on the Mississippi River
County seats in Minnesota
Populated places established in 1848